Air Vice Marshal Sir Benjamin Ball,  (6 September 1912 – 24 January 1977) was a Royal Air Force officer who served as Air Officer Commanding-in-Chief Signals Command from 1966 until its disbandment in 1969.

RAF career
Ball joined the Royal Air Force as a cadet in 1934. He served in the Second World War as a signals officer at RAF Bircham Newton and then at Headquarters RAF Reserve Command, as Chief Signals Officer in the Training Commands of the Royal Canadian Air Force and as Group Captain, Operations with No. 26 Group. After the War he became Chief Signals Officer at Headquarters Bomber Command and then became Director of Signals in the British Joint Services Mission to Washington D. C. He went on to be Station Commander at RAF Debden in 1951, Deputy Director of Operational Requirements at the Air Ministry in 1953 and Chief Signals Officer at Headquarters Bomber Command in 1957. His last appointments were as Deputy Chief Signals Officer at Supreme Headquarters Allied Powers Europe in 1960, as Senior Air Staff Officer at Headquarters Technical Training Command in 1963 and Air Officer Commanding-in-Chief at Signals Command in 1966 before retiring in 1969.

He was appointed a Knight Commander of the Order of the British Empire in the New Year Honours List in 1969.

References

1912 births
1977 deaths
Companions of the Order of the Bath
Knights Commander of the Order of the British Empire
Royal Air Force air marshals
Royal Air Force personnel of World War II